Assisted dying, assisted death, aid in dying or help to die may refer to:

 Assisted suicide, help or assistance to another person to end his or her life
 Euthanasia, the practice of intentionally ending a life to relieve pain and suffering
 Palliative sedation, administration of medications with a calming or sedative effect to a person who is on the verge of death, which may accelerate the death of the patient

See also 
 Right to die
 Dignified death